Lisbon High School is a public high school in Lisbon Falls, Androscoggin County, Maine, United States. The school mascot is the greyhound. The school is part of the Lisbon School Department. It was founded approximately in 1952, its predecessor being Lisbon Falls High School.

Sports
Lisbon has football, soccer, field hockey, cross country, basketball, wrestling, cheerleading, baseball, softball, tennis, and track teams. The school joins with Mt. Ararat High School for their ice hockey team.

The class C school has a track team, which has won MVCs (Mountain Valley Conference) every year since 2005 (as of 2017)  and won its first state title in 2014

Lisbon's field hockey team won MVCs in 2011, and won the State Championship in 2013.

Arts 
Lisbon High School has an arts program and a theatre arts and drama program.

Notable alumni
 Stephen King grew up in neighboring Durham and attended Lisbon High School. The school's library is dedicated to him and his wife.

Cultural references 
The school appears in the Stephen King novel 11/22/63 as the school at which the main character, Jake Epping, is a teacher.

References

External links
 Lisbon High School website New page

Public high schools in Maine
Schools in Androscoggin County, Maine
Lisbon, Maine